The 2021 BWF season was the overall badminton circuit organized by the Badminton World Federation (BWF) for the 2021 badminton season to publish and promote the sport. The world badminton tournament in 2021 consisted of:
1. BWF tournaments (Grade 1; Major Events)
 BWF World Men and Women's Team Championships (Thomas & Uber Cup)
 BWF World Mixed Team Championships (Sudirman Cup)
 Olympic Games
 BWF World Championships

2. BWF World Tour (Grade 2)
 Level 1 (BWF World Tour Finals)
 Level 2 (BWF World Tour Super 1000)
 Level 3 (BWF World Tour Super 750)
 Level 4 (BWF World Tour Super 500)
 Level 5 (BWF World Tour Super 300)
 Level 6 (BWF Tour Super 100)

3. Continental Circuit (Grade 3) BWF Open Tournaments: BWF International Challenge, BWF International Series, and BWF Future Series.

The Thomas & Uber Cup were teams event. The Sudirman Cup were mixed teams event. The others – Super 1000, Super 750, Super 500, Super 300, Super 100, International Challenge, International Series, and Future Series are all individual tournaments. The higher the level of tournament, the larger the prize money and the more ranking points available.

The 2021 BWF season calendar comprises these six levels of BWF tournaments.

Schedule 
This is the complete schedule of events on the 2021 calendar, with the champions and runners-up documented.
Key

January

February

March

April

May

June

July

August

September

October

November

December

BWF Player of the Year Awards 
The followings are the nominees and the winners of the 2020/2021 BWF Player of the Year Awards.

Retirements 
Following is a list of notable players (winners of the main tour title, and/or part of the BWF Rankings top 100 for at least one week) who announced their retirement from professional badminton, during the 2021 season:
  Shiho Tanaka (born 5 September 1992 in Kumamoto Prefecture, Japan) reached a career-high of no. 4 in the women's doubles on 14 June 2018. She was the bronze medalist at the 2018 World Championships in the women's doubles, and at the 2015 Summer Universiade in the women's singles. She won the year-end tournament Superseries Finals in 2017. Tanaka was part of the Japanese winning team at the 2017 Asia Mixed Team Championships, 2018 Uber Cup, and at the 2018 Asia Women's Team Championships. She announced her retirement from the badminton tournament at the press conference in the Akita Prefectural office on 29 January 2021. The 2019 BWF World Championships was her last tournament.
  Koharu Yonemoto (born 7 December 1990 in Hiroshima, Japan) reached a career-high of no. 4 in the women's doubles on 14 June 2018. She was the women's doubles bronze medalist at the 2018 World Championships, and the silver medalist at the 2013 East Asian Games. She won the year-end tournament Superseries Finals in 2017. Yonemoto was part of the Japanese winning team at the 2017 Asia Mixed Team Championships, 2018 Uber Cup, 2018 Asian Games, and at the 2018 Asia Women's Team Championships. She announced her retirement from the badminton tournament at the press conference in the Akita Prefectural office on 29 January 2021. The 2019 BWF World Championships was her last tournament.
  Chris Adcock (born 27 April 1989 in Leicester, England) reached a career-high of no. 4 in the mixed doubles and no. 9 in the men's doubles. He was two times mixed doubles European and Commonwealth Games champion. During his career in badminton, Chris Adcock has won two titles at the European Junior Championships in the boys' doubles and the mixed team event; silver at the World Junior Championships; a silver and a bronze at the World Championships; a silver at the European Games; two golds, a silver and 2 bronzes at the Commonwealth Games; and two golds and 3 bronzes at the European Championships. He was the first English player that won the year-end tournament in the 2015 Dubai World Superseries Finals (partnered with Gabby Adcock). Badminton England reported his retirement on 27 May 2021. The 2020 Denmark Open was his last tournament.
  Gabby Adcock (born 30 September 1990 in Leeds, England) reached a career-high of no. 4 in the mixed doubles and no. 16 in the women's doubles. She was two times mixed doubles European and Commonwealth Games champion. During her career in badminton, Gabby Adcock has won a gold and a bronze at the European Junior Championships; a silver at the World Junior Championships; a bronze at the World Championships; a silver at the European Games; two golds, a silver and 3 bronzes at the Commonwealth Games; and two golds at the European Championships. She was the first English player that won the year-end tournament in the 2015 Dubai World Superseries Finals (partnered with Chris Adcock). Badminton England reported her retirement on 27 May 2021. The 2020 Denmark Open was her last tournament.
  Sabrina Jaquet (born 21 June 1987 in La Chaux-de-Fonds, Switzerland) reached a career-high of no. 30 in the women's singles on 14 September 2017. She was the bronze medalist at the 2017 European Championships. She announced her retirement after her last match at the 2020 Summer Olympics on 28 July 2021. The 2020 Summer Olympics was her last tournament.
  Chow Mei Kuan (born 23 December 1994 in Cheras, Kuala Lumpur, Malaysia) reached a career-high of no. 10 in the women's doubles on 2 February 2021. She was the gold medalist at the 2018 Commonwealth Games in women's doubles and silver in the mixed team; gold at the World Junior Championships in mixed team and two bronze at the women's and mixed doubles; and bronze at the 2019 Southeast Asian Games and 2013 Summer Universiade in women's doubles. She helped the Malaysian team win a silver at the 2018 Commonwealth Games Mixed Team and bronze at the 2020 Asian Women's Team Championships. The Badminton Association of Malaysia announced her retirement on 16 August 2021. The 2020 Summer Olympics was her last tournament.
  Han Chengkai (born 29 January 1998 in Fuzhou, Fujian, China) reached a career-high of no. 5 in the men's doubles on 9 April 2019. He won the boys' doubles title at the 2016 Asian and World Junior Championships, and also 2 World Tour titles. Han also part of the Chinese team that won the 2019 Tong Yun Kai and Sudirman Cups. He announced his retirement at the age of 23 after competing at the 2021 National Games of China on 13 September 2021. The 2020 All England Open was his last tournament.
  Gergely Krausz (born 25 December 1993 in Mór, Hungary) reached a career-high of no. 81 in the men's singles on 10 May 2018. He won 2 International Series titles. He is the first ever Hungarian men's singles player to participate at the Olympics by competing at the 2020 Tokyo Games. He retired from the international badminton on 17 October 2021. The 2020 Summer Olympics was his last tournament.
  Mads Pieler Kolding (born 27 January 1988 in Holbæk, Denmark) reached a career-high of no. 4 in the men's doubles on 14 May 2018. He won the men's doubles gold medal at the 2016 European Championships, 6 Grand Prix titles and 14 International Challenge/Series titles. He was part of the Danish winning team at the 2014, 2016 and 2018 European Men's Team Championships, 2015, 2017, 2019, 2021 European Mixed Team Championships, and also at the 2016 Thomas Cup. He retired from the international badminton on 4 November 2021. The 2020 Thomas Cup was his last tournament.
  Li Junhui (born 10 May 1995 in Anshan, Liaoning, China) reached a career-high of no. 1 in the men's doubles on 6 April 2017. He won the men's doubles gold medal at the 2018 World Championships and silver at the 2020 Summer Olympics with Liu Yuchen. Li was also part of the Chinese team that won the Sudirman Cup in 2019, the Thomas Cup in 2018, and also the Asian Games in 2018. He announced his retirement through social media on 12 November 2021. The 2020 Summer Olympics was his last tournament.

References

External links
 Badminton World Federation (BWF) at www.bwfbadminton.org

season
Badminton World Federation seasons